Cedar Grove is an unincorporated community in Wilson County, Tennessee, United States. Cedar Grove is located along the northwestern border of Mt. Juliet.

References

Unincorporated communities in Wilson County, Tennessee
Unincorporated communities in Tennessee